The 2011–12 season was Paris Saint-Germain Football Club's 42nd in existence and their 39th in the top-flight of French football. The team competed in Ligue 1, the Coupe de France, the Coupe de la Ligue and the UEFA Europa League.

Players

Players, transfers, appearances and goals - 2011/2012 season.

First-team squad

Out on loan

Transfers in

Transfers out

Transfers
In

Total spending:  €106.1 million.

Out

Total income:  €10.3 million.

Expenditure:  €95.8 million.

Squad information

Board and staff

Friendly matches
Paris Saint-Germain went down to defeat in their clash with Swiss side Sion. Antoine Kombouaré's men were three goals down early in the second-half, although they did recover some pride after Siaka Tiéné and Clément Chantôme both scored late on. PSG went down to Benfica in the opening match of the Guadiana International Tournament. Under the watchful eye of new sporting director Leonardo, Paris fell behind to an early Óscar Cardozo goal, but equalized soon after when Clément Chantôme's cushioned through ball was brilliantly lobbed home by Nenê. However, in this rematch of last season's Europa League tie, which Benfica won on aggregate, Franco Jara and Javier Saviola both netted after the restart to give the Lisbon club the win once again. A day after, their second match of the Guadiana International Tournament ended in a draw against Anderlecht. Kevin Gameiro netted his first goal for PSG, only for Lukáš Mareček to equalize for the Belgians. PSG recorded their first pre-season win, beating English second tier club Brighton & Hove Albion with Nenê making the difference, his goal laid on a plate by new signing Kevin Gameiro. Opposed to Wacker Innsbruck and Roma in two halves of 45 minutes, Paris clinched the Innsbruck Cup. PSG narrowly defeated the locals and recorded a comfortable triumph over the Italians. Paris lost to the New York Red Bulls in the Emirates Cup. Salvatore Sirigu lined up in the PSG goal for the first time and he was beaten by a low shot from Joel Lindpere. PSG bounced back with a resounding victory over Boca Juniors. Jean-Eudes Maurice, Guillaume Hoarau and Ceará sealed the victory for the nouveau riche at the Emirates Stadium. Alexandre Pato's fourth-minute goal meant Carlo Ancelotti's reign at PSG started with a loss as Milan beat the capital club in the Dubai Challenge Cup at the Al-Rashid Stadium.

Competitions

Ligue 1

Paris Saint-Germain lost their first game of the season at home to Lorient, going down to a goal from Julien Quercia. Kevin Gameiro's strike had PSG on the brink of their first win of the season at Rennes, but Jonathan Pitroipa salvaged a deserved draw for the hosts. Nenê scored the winning goal from the penalty spot in Paris Saint-Germain's home win over Valenciennes. Javier Pastore supplied two assists as PSG battled back from a goal down to win at Toulouse. A moment of magic from Ligue 1 record signing Javier Pastore ended Brest's unbeaten start to the season at the Parc des Princes. Javier Pastore's stunning goal helped Paris Saint-Germain battle back from two goals down at Evian to earn a point. Kevin Gameiro converted the decisive penalty of three as PSG beat Nice at the Parc des Princes. Paris Saint-Germain were ominously impressive against Montpellier, Javier Pastore scoring twice and Kevin Gameiro once to win at the Stade de la Mosson. A sublime strike from Javier Pastore – and a late volley from Christophe Jallet – won PSG a thrilling victory over closest rivals Lyon, taking the capital club three points clear atop the table. A Kevin Gameiro hat-trick ensured Paris Saint-Germain picked up a win at Ajaccio. Two goals from Brazilian winger Nenê were enough for PSG to clinch a win over a valiant Dijon side. Nenê was the inspiration as league leaders Paris Saint-Germain came from behind to beat Caen and record their sixth straight league win. Mohamed Sissoko gave PSG the lead at Bordeaux, but Yoan Gouffran's goal meant it finished tied. Nancy threw the French title race wide open after stunning leaders Paris Saint-Germain in the capital.

Marseille took the clasico honours to condemn Paris Saint-Germain to a second straight league defeat, leaving Montpellier three points clear at the top. Paris Saint-Germain returned to winning ways beating Auxerre after a thrilling second half at the Parc des Princes. Kevin Gameiro's first goal in seven league matches proved enough for Paris Saint-Germain to beat Sochaux. Paris Saint-Germain and Lille cancelled each other out at the Parc des Princes in a goalless draw. Mathieu Bodmer headed the only goal of the game as Paris Saint-Germain won at Saint-Étienne to move clear at the top of the table once again. Nenê scored twice and Javier Pastore netted his first league goal since October as leaders PSG beat Toulouse at the Parc des Princes to give Carlo Ancelotti the perfect start to his Ligue 1 coaching career. Milan Biševac scored the only goal of the game as Paris Saint-Germain beat Brest. Paris Saint-Germain maintained their winning run under Carlo Ancelotti after strikes from Nenê and Kevin Gameiro brought the Parisians back from a goal down to beat Evian at the Parc des Princes. Carlo Ancelotti's perfect start as coach of Paris Saint-Germain ended after the capital club were held to a goalless draw by an impressive Nice. A late Guillaume Hoarau strike ensured it finished tied between leaders PSG and second-placed Montpellier. Guillaume Hoarau salvaged a draw for Paris Saint-Germain at Lyon in Ligue 1's match of the season with a 94th-minute equalizer as the capital club slipped from top spot. Argentine superstar Javier Pastore marked a return to form with a goal and an assist as Paris Saint-Germain beat Ajaccio to return to the top of the table.

Kevin Gameiro scored a dramatic injury-time winner as ten-man Paris Saint-Germain beat Dijon. Paris Saint-Germain scored through Christophe Jallet after the regulation 90 minutes for the fourth game running to salvage a draw at Caen. Paris Saint-Germain missed the opportunity to go back to the top of the Ligue 1 table when they were held at home by Bordeaux. Paris Saint-Germain suffered a first Ligue 1 defeat in 15 outings as Nancy won over the title pretenders. Paris Saint-Germain centre-half Alex scored the winner as PSG beat Marseille at the Parc des Princes. Anthony Le Tallec scored a late equaliser to secure a draw for Auxerre against Paris Saint-Germain. Inspired by a dazzling performance from Nenê, PSG got back to winning ways in emphatic fashion with a win over relegation-threatened Sochaux. Eden Hazard was once again outstanding as Lille came from behind to beat ten-man Paris Saint-Germain. Paris Saint-Germain moved to within three points of leaders Montpellier as Nenê and Javier Pastore gave the capital club a win over Saint-Étienne. PSG came back from two goals down to beat Valenciennes in a thriller in the north of France. A brilliant hat-trick from Nenê and a magnificent performance from Jérémy Ménez handed Paris Saint-Germain a win against Rennes that keeps them in the title running with a game to spare. PSG came from behind to beat Lorient at the Stade du Moustoir but the win was not enough for them to win the Ligue 1 title.

League table

Results summary

Results by round

Coupe de France 

The draw for the Coupe de France's last 64 was held as France's élite joined the competition. Last season's runners-up Paris Saint-Germain fared well, being pitted against fifth-division Locminé. PSG needed a stoppage time strike from Diego Lugano to see off the amateurs from Locminé in what was new coach Carlo Ancelotti's first competitive game in charge. In the draw for the last 32, Paris Saint-Germain were paired against Sablé, another fifth-division team. Nenê and Kevin Gameiro both scored twice as PSG eased into the last 16 of the French Cup with a big win over fifth tier Sablé. But playmaker Javier Pastore went off injured in the first half. Paris Saint-Germain went to Dijon in what was a repeat of the sides' meeting in the Coupe de la Ligue last 16 in October. On that occasion, Dijon came from 2-0 down to win 3-2. PSG had a nervous time as they held off a spirited Dijon side to narrowly win – thanks to a Nenê goal – and reach the quarter-finals. The draw for the last eight of the French Cup produced the stand-out fixture between eight-times winners Paris Saint-Germain and Olympique Lyonnais. Lyon inflicted a first defeat of the Ancelotti era on PSG and reached the last four of the French Cup, where they joined Gazélec Ajaccio, who stunned Montpellier, and Rennes, winners over Valenciennes.

Coupe de la Ligue

The draw for the Coupe de la Ligue's round of 16 pitted Dijon playing host to Paris Saint-Germain days after their Week 11 league clash at the Parc des Princes as Ligue 1's six sides competing in Europe entered into the competition. Dijon, inspired by Brice Jovial, came from two goals down to dump league leaders PSG out of the League Cup thanks to a brilliant win.

UEFA Europa League

Big-spending Paris Saint-Germain had to face Greek outfit Olympiakos Volou in the UEFA Europa League play-offs over two legs for a place in the group stages. Olympiakos Volou, however, were excluded from the Europa League for their involvement in a match-fixing scandal, with UEFA handing the Greek club a three-season ban from continental competition. Differdange from Luxembourg replaced Olympiakos Volou. The UEFA Appeals Body seconded the decision of the Control and Disciplinary Body to exclude Olympiakos Volou from the Europa League competition. Javier Pastore provided two assists in his debut to help Paris Saint-Germain take a commanding lead into the second leg of their UEFA Europa League play-off tie against Differdange. Paris Saint-Germain never looked in danger of squandering their first-leg lead as they claimed a convincing win over Differdange to take the tie 6-0 on aggregate and advance to the group stages. However, it did take Antoine Kombouaré's star-studded side more than an hour to break down the Luxembourgish outfit, but Nenê's spectacular strike from distance was worth the wait. Paris Saint-Germain were top seeds for the draw in Monaco and were placed in a testing Group F alongside Athletic Bilbao, Slovan Bratislava and Red Bull Salzburg.

Paris Saint-Germain produced a classy attacking display to beat Red Bull Salzburg. Nenê, Mathieu Bodmer and Jérémy Ménez all scored to hand their side the perfect Europa League start. PSG fell to a defeat - their first in 11 matches - away to Athletic Bilbao as Mohamed Sissoko saw red in his first start for the club. After being reduced to nine men Paris Saint-Germain hung on to secure a potentially vital point thanks to a scoreless draw against Slovan Bratislava. Javier Pastore's lone strike was enough to secure Paris Saint-Germain a narrow win over a tenacious Slovan Bratislava side at the Parc des Princes and reassert the capital club's claim on a qualifying spot for the knockout rounds of the Europa League. Paris Saint-Germain were outplayed by Red Bull Salzburg and had to win against Athletic Bilbao - and hope that Salzburg didn't beat Slovan Bratislava - if they were to book a place in the Europa League's last 16. Paris Saint-Germain produced a late surge to beat Athletic Bilbao, but their Europa League qualification hopes were dashed after rivals Red Bull Salzburg beat Slovan Bratislava in Slovakia.

Appearances and goals
Only Paris Saint-Germain players with at least one appearance in a competitive match with the first team during the season.

References

External links

Official websites
PSG.fr – Site officiel
Paris Saint-Germain  at LFP
Paris Saint-Germain at UEFA
Paris Saint-Germain at FIFA

Paris Saint-Germain F.C. seasons
Paris Saint-Germain
Paris Saint-Germain